50th Division or 50th Infantry Division may refer to:

Infantry divisions:
 50th Division (1st Formation)(People's Republic of China)
 50th Infantry Division (German Empire)
 50th Reserve Division (German Empire)
 50th Infantry Division Regina, Kingdom of Italy
 50th Division (Imperial Japanese Army)

 50th (Northumbrian) Division, United Kingdom, World War I
 50th (Northumbrian) Infantry Division, United Kingdom, World War II

Armoured divisions:
 50th Armored Division (United States)

Aviation divisions:
 50th Air Division (United States)

See also
 50 Divisions, an American compilation of construction information
 50th Brigade (disambiguation)
 50th Regiment (disambiguation)
 50th Squadron (disambiguation)